Cosimo Ferro (born 8 June 1962) is an Italian fencer. He won a bronze medal in the team épée event at the 1984 Summer Olympics.

References

External links
 
 
 

1962 births
Living people
Italian male fencers
Olympic fencers of Italy
Fencers at the 1984 Summer Olympics
Olympic bronze medalists for Italy
Olympic medalists in fencing
Sportspeople from Catania
Medalists at the 1984 Summer Olympics